Spoolsville is an unincorporated community in Frederick County, Maryland, United States. Bowlus Mill House was listed on the National Register of Historic Places in 1996.

References

Unincorporated communities in Frederick County, Maryland
Unincorporated communities in Maryland